Spanish is a Romance language of the Indo-European language family that evolved from colloquial Latin spoken on the Iberian Peninsula. Today, it is a global language with about 486 million native speakers, mainly in the Americas and Spain. Spanish is the official language of 20 countries. It is the world's second-most spoken native language after Mandarin Chinese; the world's fourth-most spoken language overall after English, Mandarin Chinese, and Hindustani (Hindi-Urdu); and the world's most widely spoken Romance language. The largest population of native speakers is in Mexico.

Spanish is part of the Ibero-Romance group of languages, which evolved from several dialects of Vulgar Latin in Iberia after the collapse of the Western Roman Empire in the 5th century. The oldest Latin texts with traces of Spanish come from mid-northern Iberia in the 9th century, and the first systematic written use of the language happened in Toledo, a prominent city of the Kingdom of Castile, in the 13th century. Spanish colonialism in the early modern period spurred on the introduction of the language to overseas locations, most notably to the Americas.

As a Romance language, Spanish is a descendant of Latin, and has one of the smaller degrees of difference from it (about 20%) alongside Sardinian and Italian. Around 75% of modern Spanish vocabulary is derived from Latin, including Latin borrowings from Ancient Greek. Alongside English and French, it is also one of the most taught foreign languages throughout the world. Spanish does not feature prominently as a scientific language; however, it is better represented in areas like humanities and social sciences. Spanish is also the third most used language on internet websites after English and Chinese.

Spanish is one of the six official languages of the United Nations, and it is also used as an official language by the European Union, Organization of American States, Union of South American Nations, Community of Latin American and Caribbean States, African Union and many other international organizations.

Name of the language and etymology

Name of the language 
In Spain and in some other parts of the Spanish-speaking world, Spanish is called not only  but also  (Castilian), the language from the Kingdom of Castile, contrasting it with other languages spoken in Spain such as Galician, Basque, Asturian, Catalan, Aragonese and Occitan.

"the other Spanish languages"). Article III reads as follows:

The Royal Spanish Academy (Real Academia Española), on the other hand, currently uses the term  in its publications. However, from 1713 to 1923, it called the language .

The  (a language guide published by the Royal Spanish Academy) states that, although the Royal Spanish Academy prefers to use the term  in its publications when referring to the Spanish language, both terms— and —are regarded as synonymous and equally valid.

Etymology
The term  is related to Castile ( or archaically ), the kingdom where the language was originally spoken.

Different etymologies have been suggested for the term  (Spanish). According to the Royal Spanish Academy,  derives from the Occitan word  and that, in turn, derives from the Vulgar Latin  ('of Hispania'). Hispania was the Roman name for the Iberian Peninsula.

There are other hypotheses apart from the one suggested by the Royal Spanish Academy.

History 

Like the other Romance languages, the Spanish language evolved from Vulgar Latin, which was brought to the Iberian Peninsula by the Romans during the Second Punic War, beginning in 210 BC. Several pre-Roman languages (also called Paleohispanic languages)—some distantly related to Latin as Indo-European languages, and some that are not related at all—were previously spoken in the Iberian Peninsula. These languages included Proto-Basque, Iberian, Lusitanian, Celtiberian and Gallaecian.

The first documents to show traces of what is today regarded as the precursor of modern Spanish are from the 9th century. Throughout the Middle Ages and into the modern era, the most important influences on the Spanish lexicon came from neighboring Romance languages—Mozarabic (Andalusi Romance), Navarro-Aragonese, Leonese, Catalan, Portuguese, Galician, Occitan, and later, French and Italian. Spanish also borrowed a considerable number of words from Arabic, as well as a minor influence from the Germanic Gothic language through the migration of tribes and a period of Visigoth rule in Iberia. In addition, many more words were borrowed from Latin through the influence of written language and the liturgical language of the Church. The loanwords were taken from both Classical Latin and Renaissance Latin, the form of Latin in use at that time.

According to the theories of Ramón Menéndez Pidal, local sociolects of Vulgar Latin evolved into Spanish, in the north of Iberia, in an area centered in the city of Burgos, and this dialect was later brought to the city of Toledo, where the written standard of Spanish was first developed, in the 13th century. In this formative stage, Spanish developed a strongly differing variant from its close cousin, Leonese, and, according to some authors, was distinguished by a heavy Basque influence (see Iberian Romance languages). The written standard for this new language was developed in the cities of Toledo, in the 13th to 16th centuries, and Madrid, from the 1570s.

The development of the Spanish sound system from that of Vulgar Latin exhibits most of the changes that are typical of Western Romance languages, including lenition of intervocalic consonants (thus Latin  > Spanish ). The diphthongization of Latin stressed short  and —which occurred in open syllables in French and Italian, but not at all in Catalan or Portuguese—is found in both open and closed syllables in Spanish, as shown in the following table:

 > Spanish , and Latin  > Spanish
).

In early Spanish (but not in Catalan or Portuguese) it merged with the consonant written b (a bilabial with plosive and fricative allophones).

Typical of Spanish (as also of neighboring Gascon extending as far north as the Gironde estuary, and found in a small area of Calabria), attributed by some scholars to a Basque substratum was the mutation of Latin initial  into  whenever it was followed by a vowel that did not diphthongize. The , still preserved in spelling, is now silent in most varieties of the language, although in some Andalusian and Caribbean dialects it is still aspirated in some words.

Compare the examples in the following table:

Some consonant clusters of Latin also produced characteristically different results in these languages, as shown in the examples in the following table:

See History of Spanish (Modern development of the Old Spanish sibilants) for details.

The , written in Salamanca in 1492 by Elio Antonio de Nebrija, was the first grammar written for a modern European language. According to a popular anecdote, when Nebrija presented it to Queen Isabella I, she asked him what was the use of such a work, and he answered that language is the instrument of empire. In his introduction to the grammar, dated 18 August 1492, Nebrija wrote that "... language was always the companion of empire."

From the 16th century onwards, the language was taken to the Spanish-discovered America and the Spanish East Indies via Spanish colonization of America. Miguel de Cervantes, author of Don Quixote, is such a well-known reference in the world that Spanish is often called  ("the language of Cervantes").

In the 20th century, Spanish was introduced to Equatorial Guinea and the Western Sahara, and to areas of the United States that had not been part of the Spanish Empire, such as Spanish Harlem in New York City. For details on borrowed words and other external influences upon Spanish, see Influences on the Spanish language.

Geographical distribution 

Spanish is the primary language in 20 countries worldwide. As of 2023, it is estimated that about 486 million people speak Spanish as a native language, making it the second most spoken language by number of native speakers. An additional 75 million speak Spanish as a second or foreign language, making it the fourth most spoken language in the world overall after English, Mandarin Chinese, and Hindi with a total number of 538 million speakers. Spanish is also the third most used language on the Internet, after English and Chinese.

Europe 

Spanish is the official language of Spain, the country after which it is named and from which it originated. Other European territories in which it is also widely spoken include Gibraltar and Andorra.

Spanish is also spoken by immigrant communities in other European countries, such as the United Kingdom, France, Italy, and Germany. Spanish is an official language of the European Union.

Americas

Hispanic America 

Today, the majority of the Spanish speakers live in Hispanic America. Nationally, Spanish is the official language—either de facto or de jure—of Argentina, Bolivia (co-official with 36 indigenous languages), Chile, Colombia, Costa Rica, Cuba, Dominican Republic, Ecuador, El Salvador, Guatemala, Honduras, Mexico (co-official with 63 indigenous languages), Nicaragua, Panama, Paraguay (co-official with Guaraní), Peru (co-official with Quechua, Aymara, and "the other indigenous languages"), Puerto Rico (co-official with English), Uruguay, and Venezuela.

United States

According to the 2020 census, over 60 million people of the U.S. population were of Hispanic or Hispanic American by origin. In turn, 41.8 million people in the United States aged five or older speak Spanish at home, or about 13% of the population. The Spanish language has a long history of presence in the United States due to early Spanish and, later, Mexican administration over territories now forming the southwestern states, also Louisiana ruled by Spain from 1762 to 1802, as well as Florida, which was Spanish territory until 1821, and Puerto Rico which was Spanish until 1898.

Spanish is by far the most common second language in the country, with over 50 million total speakers if non-native or second-language speakers are included. While English is the de facto national language of the country, Spanish is often used in public services and notices at the federal and state levels. Spanish is also used in administration in the state of New Mexico. The language has a strong influence in major metropolitan areas such as those of Los Angeles, Miami, San Antonio, New York, San Francisco, Dallas, Tucson and Phoenix of the Arizona Sun Corridor, as well as more recently, Chicago, Las Vegas, Boston, Denver, Houston, Indianapolis, Philadelphia, Cleveland, Salt Lake City, Atlanta, Nashville, Orlando, Tampa, Raleigh and Baltimore-Washington, D.C. due to 20th- and 21st-century immigration.

Rest of the Americas 
Although Spanish has no official recognition in the former British colony of Belize (known until 1973 as British Honduras) where English is the sole official language, according to the 2010 census it was then spoken natively by 45% of the population and 56.6% of the total population were able to speak the language.

Due to their proximity to Spanish-speaking countries and small existing native Spanish speaking minority, Trinidad and Tobago has implemented Spanish language teaching into its education system. The Trinidad government launched the Spanish as a First Foreign Language (SAFFL) initiative in March 2005.

In addition to sharing most of its borders with Spanish-speaking countries, the creation of Mercosur in the early 1990s induced a favorable situation for the promotion of Spanish language teaching in Brazil. In 2005, the National Congress of Brazil approved a bill, signed into law by the President, making it mandatory for schools to offer Spanish as an alternative foreign language course in both public and private secondary schools in Brazil. In September 2016 this law was revoked by Michel Temer after impeachment of Dilma Rousseff. In many border towns and villages along Paraguay and Uruguay, a mixed language known as Portuñol is spoken.

Africa

Sub-Saharan Africa 

Equatorial Guinea is the only Spanish-speaking country located entirely in Africa, with the language introduced during the Spanish colonial period. Enshrined in the constitution as an official language (alongside French and Portuguese), Spanish features prominently in the Equatoguinean education system and is the primary  language used in government and business. Whereas it is not the mother tongue of virtually any of its speakers, the vast majority of the population is proficient in Spanish. The Instituto Cervantes estimates that 87.7% of the population is fluent in Spanish. This figure highlights Equatorial Guinea as having a higher proportion of proficient speakers of a colonial language relative to the respective metropolitan languages in other West and Central African nations.

Spanish is spoken by very small communities in Angola due to Cuban influence from the Cold War and in South Sudan among South Sudanese natives that relocated to Cuba during the Sudanese wars and returned for their country's independence.

North Africa and Macaronesia 

The Spanish spoken in the Canary Islands, traces its origins back to the Castilian conquest in the 15th century, and, in addition to a resemblance to Western Andalusian speech patterns, it also features strong influence from the Spanish varieties spoken in the Americas, which in turn have also been influenced historically by Canarian Spanish.

While far from the heyday of the Spanish protectorate in Morocco, there are some presence of the Spanish language in the north of Morocco, stemming for example from the availability of certain Spanish-language media. Many northern Moroccans have rudimentary knowledge of Spanish. Spanish has also presence in the education system of the country (either by means of selected education centers running the Spain's education system, primarily located in the North, and the availability of Spanish as foreign language subject in secondary education).

In Western Sahara, formerly Spanish Sahara, a primarily Hassaniya Arabic-speaking territory, Spanish was officially spoken as the language of the colonial administration during the late 19th and 20th centuries. Today, Spanish is present in the partially-recognized Sahrawi Arab Democratic Republic and in the Sahrawi refugee camps in Tindouf (Algeria), where the Spanish language is still taught as a second language, largely by Cuban educators. The number of Spanish speakers is unknown.

Spanish is also an official language of the African Union.

Asia 

Spanish was an official language of the Philippines from the beginning of Spanish administration in 1565 to a constitutional change in 1973. During Spanish colonization, it was the language of government, trade, and education, and was spoken as a first language by Spaniards and educated Filipinos (Ilustrados). Despite a public education system set up by the colonial government, by the end of Spanish rule in 1898, only about 10% of the population had knowledge of Spanish, mostly those of Spanish descent or elite standing.

Spanish continued to be official and used in Philippine literature and press during the early years of American administration after the Spanish–American War but was eventually replaced by English as the primary language of administration and education by the 1920s. Nevertheless, despite a significant decrease in influence and speakers, Spanish remained an official language of the Philippines upon independence in 1946, alongside English and Filipino, a standardized version of Tagalog.

Spanish was briefly removed from official status in 1973 but reimplemented under the administration of Ferdinand Marcos two months later. It remained an official language until the ratification of the present constitution in 1987, in which it was re-designated as a voluntary and optional auxiliary language. Despite an effort to reintroduce the language into the Philippine education system in 2010, the initiative failed to gain any traction, with the number of secondary schools at which the language is offered either as a compulsory subject or an elective remaining very limited. Today, the actual number of proficient Spanish speakers is around 400,000, or under 0.5% of the population. 

Aside from standard Spanish, a Spanish-based creole language called Chavacano developed in the southern Philippines. However, it is not mutually intelligible with Spanish. The number of Chavacano-speakers was estimated at 1.2 million in 1996. The local languages of the Philippines also retain significant Spanish influence, with many words derived from Mexican Spanish, owing to the administration of the islands by Spain through New Spain until 1821, until direct governance from Madrid afterwards to 1898.

Oceania

Spanish is the official and most spoken language on Easter Island, which is geographically part of Polynesia in Oceania and politically part of Chile. However, Easter Island's traditional language is Rapa Nui, an Eastern Polynesian language.

As a legacy of comprising the former Spanish East Indies, Spanish loan words are present in the local languages of Guam, Northern Mariana Islands, Palau, Marshall Islands and Micronesia.

In addition, in Australia and New Zealand, there are native Spanish communities, resulting from emigration from Spanish-speaking countries (mainly from the Southern Cone).

Spanish speakers by country 
20 countries speak Spanish including 2 not official Belize and United States of America.

Grammar 

Most of the grammatical and typological features of Spanish are shared with the other Romance languages. Spanish is a fusional language. The noun and adjective systems exhibit two genders and two numbers. In addition, articles and some pronouns and determiners have a neuter gender in their singular form. There are about fifty conjugated forms per verb, with 3 tenses: past, present, future; 2 aspects for past: perfective, imperfective; 4 moods: indicative, subjunctive, conditional, imperative; 3 persons: first, second, third; 2 numbers: singular, plural; 3 verboid forms: infinitive, gerund, and past participle. The indicative mood is the unmarked one, while the subjunctive mood expresses uncertainty or indetermination, and is commonly paired with the conditional, which is a mood used to express "would" (as in, "I would eat if I had food); the imperative is a mood to express a command, commonly a one word phrase – "¡Di!", "¡Talk!".

Verbs express T-V distinction by using different persons for formal and informal addresses. (For a detailed overview of verbs, see Spanish verbs and Spanish irregular verbs.)

Spanish syntax is considered right-branching, meaning that subordinate or modifying constituents tend to be placed after head words. The language uses prepositions (rather than postpositions or inflection of nouns for case), and usually—though not always—places adjectives after nouns, as do most other Romance languages.

Spanish is classified as a subject–verb–object language; however, as in most Romance languages, constituent order is highly variable and governed mainly by topicalization and focus rather than by syntax. It is a "pro-drop", or "null-subject" language—that is, it allows the deletion of subject pronouns when they are pragmatically unnecessary. Spanish is described as a "verb-framed" language, meaning that the direction of motion is expressed in the verb while the mode of locomotion is expressed adverbially (e.g. subir corriendo or salir volando; the respective English equivalents of these examples—'to run up' and 'to fly out'—show that English is, by contrast, "satellite-framed", with mode of locomotion expressed in the verb and direction in an adverbial modifier).

Phonology 

The Spanish phonological system evolved from that of Vulgar Latin. Its development exhibits some traits in common with other Western Romance languages, others with the neighboring Hispanic varieties—especially Leonese and Aragonese—as well as other features unique to Spanish. Spanish is alone among its immediate neighbors in having undergone frequent aspiration and eventual loss of the Latin initial  sound (e.g. Cast.  vs. Leon. and Arag. ). Where Latin had  before a vowel (e.g. ) or the ending ,  (e.g. ), Old Spanish produced , that in Modern Spanish became the velar fricative , whereas neighboring languages have the palatal lateral  (e.g. Portuguese , ; Catalan).

Segmental phonology 

The Spanish phonemic inventory consists of five vowel phonemes and 17 to 19 consonant phonemes (the exact number depending on the dialect).

The Spanish consonant system is characterized by (1) three nasal phonemes, and one or two (depending on the dialect) lateral phoneme(s), which in syllable-final position lose their contrast and are subject to assimilation to a following consonant; (2) three voiceless stops and the affricate ; (3) three or four (depending on the dialect) voiceless fricatives; (4) a set of voiced obstruents—, and sometimes —which alternate between approximant and plosive allophones depending on the environment; and (5) a phonemic distinction between the "tapped" and "trilled" r-sounds (single  and double  in orthography).

In the following table of consonant phonemes,  is marked with an asterisk (*) to indicate that it is preserved only in some dialects.

The phoneme  is in parentheses to indicate that it appears only in loanwords.

Prosody 
Spanish is classified by its rhythm as a syllable-timed language: each syllable has approximately the same duration regardless of stress.

Spanish intonation varies significantly according to dialect but generally conforms to a pattern of falling tone for declarative sentences and wh-questions (who, what, why, etc.) and rising tone for yes/no questions. There are no syntactic markers to distinguish between questions and statements and thus, the recognition of declarative or interrogative depends entirely on intonation.

Stress most often occurs on any of the last three syllables of a word, with some rare exceptions at the fourth-to-last or earlier syllables. Stress tends to occur as follows:
 in words that end with a monophthong, on the penultimate syllable
 when the word ends in a diphthong, on the final syllable.
 Preantepenultimate stress (stress on the fourth-to-last syllable) occurs rarely, only on verbs with clitic pronouns attached (e.g.  'saving them for him/her/them/you').

Exceptions to those rules are indicated by an acute accent mark over the vowel of the stressed syllable. (See Spanish orthography.)

Speaker population 

Spanish is the official, or national language in 18 countries and one territory in the Americas, Spain, and Equatorial Guinea. With a population of over 410 million, Hispanophone America accounts for the vast majority of Spanish speakers, of which Mexico is the most populous Spanish-speaking country. In the European Union, Spanish is the mother tongue of 8% of the population, with an additional 7% speaking it as a second language. Additionally, Spanish is the second most spoken language in the United States and is by far the most popular foreign language among students. In 2015, it was estimated that over 50 million Americans spoke Spanish, about 41 million of whom were native speakers. With continued immigration and increased use of the language domestically in public spheres and media, the number of Spanish speakers in the United States is expected to continue growing over the forthcoming decades.

Dialectal variation 

While being mutually intelligible, there are important variations (phonological, grammatical, and lexical) in the spoken Spanish of the various regions of Spain and throughout the Spanish-speaking areas of the Americas.

The variety with the most speakers is Mexican Spanish. It is spoken by more than twenty percent of the world's Spanish speakers (more than 112 million of the total of more than 500 million, according to the table above). One of its main features is the reduction or loss of unstressed vowels, mainly when they are in contact with the sound /s/.

In Spain, northern dialects are popularly thought of as closer to the standard, although positive attitudes toward southern dialects have increased significantly in the last 50 years. The speech from the educated classes of Madrid is the standard variety for use on radio and television in Spain and it is indicated by many as the one that has most influenced the written standard for Spanish. Central (European) Spanish speech patterns have been noted to be in the process of merging with more innovative southern varieties (including Eastern Andalusian and Murcian), as an emerging interdialectal levelled koine buffered between the Madrid's traditional national standard and the Seville speech trends.

Phonology 

The four main phonological divisions are based respectively on (1) the phoneme  ("theta"), (2) the debuccalization of syllable-final , (3) the sound of the spelled , (4) and the phoneme  ("turned y"),
In other areas (some parts of southern Spain, the Canary Islands, and the Americas),  does not exist and  occurs instead. The maintenance of phonemic contrast is called  in Spanish, while the merger is generally called  (in reference to the usual realization of the merged phoneme as ) or, occasionally,  (referring to its interdental realization, in some parts of southern Spain).
When there is no debuccalization, the syllable-final  is pronounced as voiceless "apico-alveolar" sibilant or as a voiceless dental sibilant in the same fashion as in the next paragraph.
 The sound that corresponds to the letter  is pronounced in northern and central Spain as a voiceless "apico-alveolar" sibilant  (also described acoustically as "grave" and articulatorily as "retracted"), with a weak "hushing" sound reminiscent of  fricatives. In Andalusia, Canary Islands and most of Hispanic America (except in the Paisa region of Colombia) it is pronounced as a voiceless dental sibilant , much like the most frequent pronunciation of the /s/ of English. Because /s/ is one of the most frequent phonemes in Spanish, the difference of pronunciation is one of the first to be noted by a Spanish-speaking person to differentiate Spaniards from Spanish-speakers of the Americas.
As with other forms of allophony across world languages, the small difference of the spelled  and the spelled  is usually not perceived (the difference is not heard) by people who do not produce them as different phonemes. Such a phonemic merger is called  in Spanish. In Rioplatense Spanish, the merged phoneme is generally pronounced as a postalveolar fricative, either voiced  (as in English measure or the French ) in the central and western parts of the dialectal region, or voiceless  (as in the French  or Portuguese ) in and around Buenos Aires and Montevideo.

Morphology 
The main morphological variations between dialects of Spanish involve differing uses of pronouns, especially those of the second person and, to a lesser extent, the object pronouns of the third person.

Voseo 

In ,  is the subject form ("you say") and the form for the object of a preposition ("I am going with you"), while the direct and indirect object forms, and the possessives, are the same as those associated with :  ("You know your friends respect you").

The verb forms of general voseo are the same as those used with  except in the present tense (indicative and imperative) verbs.

In Chilean  on the other hand, almost all verb forms are distinct from their standard -forms.

In Chile, for example, verbal voseo is much more common than the actual use of the pronoun vos, which is usually reserved for highly informal situations.

And in Central American , one can see even further distinction.

Distribution in Spanish-speaking regions of the Americas 
Although  is not used in Spain, it occurs in many Spanish-speaking regions of the Americas as the primary spoken form of the second-person singular familiar pronoun, with wide differences in social consideration.

Some researchers maintain that  can be heard in some parts of eastern Cuba, and others assert that it is absent from the island.

 exists as the second-person usage with an intermediate degree of formality alongside the more familiar  in Chile, in the Venezuelan state of Zulia, on the Caribbean coast of Colombia, in the Azuero Peninsula in Panama, in the Mexican state of Chiapas, and in parts of Guatemala.

Areas of generalized  include Argentina, Nicaragua, eastern Bolivia, El Salvador, Guatemala, Honduras, Costa Rica, Paraguay, Uruguay and the Colombian departments of Antioquia, Caldas, Risaralda, Quindio and Valle del Cauca.

Ustedes 

 functions as formal and informal second-person plural in all of Hispanic America, the Canary Islands, and parts of Andalusia. It agrees with verbs in the 3rd person plural.

Usted 
 is the usual second-person singular pronoun in a formal context, but it is used jointly with the third-person singular voice of the verb. It is used to convey respect toward someone who is a generation older or is of higher authority ("you, sir"/"you, ma'am"). This usage is sometimes called  in Spanish.

In Central America, especially in Honduras,  is often used as a formal pronoun to convey respect between the members of a romantic couple.  is also used that way between parents and children in the Andean regions of Ecuador, Colombia and Venezuela.

Third-person object pronouns 
The usage is sometimes called "etymological", as these direct and indirect object pronouns are a continuation, respectively, of the accusative and dative pronouns of Latin, the ancestor language of Spanish.

Vocabulary 
Some words can be significantly different in different Hispanophone countries. Most Spanish speakers can recognize other Spanish forms even in places where they are not commonly used, but Spaniards generally do not recognize specifically American usages.

Relation to other languages 

Spanish is closely related to the other West Iberian Romance languages, including Asturian, Aragonese, Galician, Ladino, Leonese, Mirandese and Portuguese.

It is generally acknowledged that Portuguese and Spanish speakers can communicate in written form, with varying degrees of mutual intelligibility. Mutual intelligibility of the written Spanish and Portuguese languages is remarkably high, and the at times variance of the spoken forms are based more on the phonology than on grammatical and lexical usage. Ethnologue gives estimates of the lexical similarity between related languages in terms of precise percentages. For Spanish and Portuguese, that figure is 89%. Italian, on the other hand is phonologically similar to Spanish, but has a lower lexical and grammatical similarity of 82%. Mutual intelligibility between Spanish and French or between Spanish and Romanian is lower still, given lexical similarity ratings of 75% and 71% respectively. Comprehension of Spanish by French speakers who have not studied the language is much lower, at an estimated 45%. In general, thanks to the common features of the writing systems of the Romance languages, interlingual comprehension of the written word is greater than that of oral communication.

The Spanish vocabulary has been influenced by several languages: As in other European languages, Classical Greek words (Hellenisms) are abundant in several fields, mainly in Art, Science, Politics, Nature, etc. Its vocabulary has also been influenced by Arabic, having developed during the Al-Andalus era in the Iberian Peninsula, with around 8% of its vocabulary having Arabic lexical roots. It has also been influenced by Basque, Iberian, Celtiberian, Visigothic, and other neighboring Ibero-Romance languages. Additionally, it has absorbed vocabulary from other languages, particularly other Romance languages such as French, Latin, Mozarabic, Portuguese, Galician, Catalan, Occitan, and Sardinian, as well as from Quechua, Nahuatl, and other indigenous languages of the Americas.

The following table compares the forms of some common words in several Romance languages:

1. In Romance etymology, Latin terms are given in the Accusative since most forms derive from this case.
2. As in "us very selves", an emphatic expression.
3. Also  in early modern Portuguese (e.g.
4. Alternatively  in French.
5.  in many Southern Italian dialects and languages.
6. Medieval Catalan (e.g. Llibre dels fets).
7. Modified with the learned suffix -ción.
8. Depending on the written norm used (see Reintegrationism).
9. From Basque esku, "hand" + erdi, "half, incomplete". Notice that this negative meaning also applies for Latin sinistra(m) ("dark, unfortunate").
10. Romanian caș (from Latin ) means a type of cheese. The universal term for cheese in Romanian is brânză (from unknown etymology).

Judaeo-Spanish 

Judaeo-Spanish, also known as Ladino, is a variety of Spanish which preserves many features of medieval Spanish and Portuguese and is spoken by descendants of the Sephardi Jews who were expelled from Spain in the 15th century. Conversely, in Portugal the vast majority of the Portuguese Jews converted and became 'New Christians'. Therefore, its relationship to Spanish is comparable with that of the Yiddish language to German. Ladino speakers today are almost exclusively Sephardi Jews, with family roots in Turkey, Greece, or the Balkans, and living mostly in Israel, Turkey, and the United States, with a few communities in Hispanic America. Judaeo-Spanish lacks the Native American vocabulary which was acquired by standard Spanish during the Spanish colonial period, and it retains many archaic features which have since been lost in standard Spanish. It contains, however, other vocabulary which is not found in standard Spanish, including vocabulary from Hebrew, French, Greek and Turkish, and other languages spoken where the Sephardim settled.

Judaeo-Spanish is in serious danger of extinction because many native speakers today are elderly as well as elderly olim (immigrants to Israel) who have not transmitted the language to their children or grandchildren. However, it is experiencing a minor revival among Sephardi communities, especially in music. In Latin American communities, the danger of extinction is also due to assimilation by modern Spanish.

A related dialect is Haketia, the Judaeo-Spanish of northern Morocco. This too tended to assimilate with modern Spanish, during the Spanish occupation of the region.

Writing system 

However, the digraph  ('strong r', 'double r', or simply ), which also represents a distinct phoneme , was not similarly regarded as a single letter. Since 1994  and  have been treated as letter pairs for collation purposes, though they remained a part of the alphabet until 2010.

Thus, the Spanish alphabet has the following 27 letters:

Since 2010, none of the digraphs are considered letters by the Royal Spanish Academy.

Exceptions to this rule are indicated by placing an acute accent on the stressed vowel.

The interrogative pronouns (etc.) also receive accents in direct or indirect questions, and some demonstratives (etc.) can be accented when used as pronouns. Accent marks used to be omitted on capital letters (a widespread practice in the days of typewriters and the early days of computers when only lowercase vowels were available with accents), although the  advises against this and the orthographic conventions taught at schools enforce the use of the accent.

A diaeresis  indicates that it is not silent as it normally would be (e.g., 'stork', is pronounced ; if it were written *, it would be pronounced *).

Organizations

Royal Spanish Academy 

The Royal Spanish Academy, founded in 1713, together with the 21 other national ones (see Association of Spanish Language Academies), exercises a standardizing influence through its publication of dictionaries and widely respected grammar and style guides.
Because of influence and for other sociohistorical reasons, a standardized form of the language (Standard Spanish) is widely acknowledged for use in literature, academic contexts and the media.

Association of Spanish Language Academies 

The Association of Spanish Language Academies (or ) is the entity which regulates the Spanish language. It was created in Mexico in 1951 and represents the union of all the separate academies in the Spanish-speaking world. It comprises the academies of 23 countries, ordered by date of academy foundation: Spain (1713), Colombia (1871), Ecuador (1874), Mexico (1875), El Salvador (1876), Venezuela (1883), Chile (1885), Peru (1887), Guatemala (1887), Costa Rica (1923), Philippines (1924), Panama (1926), Cuba (1926),
Paraguay (1927), Dominican Republic (1927), Bolivia (1927), Nicaragua (1928), Argentina (1931), Uruguay (1943), Honduras (1949), Puerto Rico (1955), United States (1973) and Equatorial Guinea (2016).

Cervantes Institute 

The  (Cervantes Institute) is a worldwide nonprofit organization created by the Spanish government in 1991. This organization has branches in 45 countries, with 88 centers devoted to the Spanish and Hispanic American cultures and Spanish language. The goals of the Institute are to promote universally the education, the study, and the use of Spanish as a second language, to support methods and activities that help the process of Spanish-language education, and to contribute to the advancement of the Spanish and Hispanic American cultures in non-Spanish-speaking countries. The institute's 2015 report "El español, una lengua viva" (Spanish, a living language) estimated that there were 559 million Spanish speakers worldwide. Its latest annual report "El español en el mundo 2018" (Spanish in the world 2018) counts 577 million Spanish speakers worldwide. Among the sources cited in the report is the U.S. Census Bureau, which estimates that the U.S. will have 138 million Spanish speakers by 2050, making it the biggest Spanish-speaking nation on earth, with Spanish the mother tongue of almost a third of its citizens.

Official use by international organizations 

Spanish is one of the official languages of the United Nations, the European Union, the World Trade Organization, the Organization of American States, the Organization of Ibero-American States, the African Union, the Union of South American Nations, the Antarctic Treaty Secretariat, the Latin Union, the Caricom, the North American Free Trade Agreement, the Inter-American Development Bank, and numerous other international organizations.

Sample text 
Article 1 of the Universal Declaration of Human Rights in Spanish:

Article 1 of the Universal Declaration of Human Rights in English:
All human beings are born free and equal in dignity and rights. They are endowed with reason and conscience and should act towards one another in a spirit of brotherhood.

See also 

 Fundéu BBVA
 List of Spanish-language poets
 Spanish as a second or foreign language
 Spanish-language literature
 Spanish-language music

Spanish words and phrases
 Cuento
 List of English–Spanish interlingual homographs
 Longest word in Spanish
 Most common words in Spanish
 Spanish profanity
 Spanish proverbs

Spanish-speaking world
 Countries where Spanish is an official language
 Hispanic culture
 Hispanicization
 Hispanidad
 Hispanism
 Panhispanism

Influences on the Spanish language
 Arabic influence on the Spanish language
 List of Spanish words of Germanic origin
 List of Spanish words of Philippine origin

Dialects and languages influenced by Spanish
 Caló
 Chamorro
 Frespañol
 Llanito
 Palenquero
 Papiamento
 Philippine languages
 Chavacano
 Portuñol
 Spanglish
 Media Lengua
 List of English words of Spanish origin

Spanish dialects and varieties
 Spanish dialects and varieties
 European Spanish
 Andalusian Spanish
 Andalusian language movement
 Canarian Spanish
 Castrapo (Galician Spanish)
 Castúo (Extremaduran Spanish)
 Murcian Spanish
 Spanish in the Americas
 North American Spanish
 Central American Spanish
 Caribbean Spanish
 South American Spanish
 Spanish in the United States
 Spanish in Africa
 Equatoguinean Spanish
 Saharan Spanish
 Spanish in Asia
 Spanish in the Philippines

Notes

References

Citations

Sources

External links 
 Organizations
 Real Academia Española (RAE), Royal Spanish Academy. Spain's official institution, with a mission to ensure the stability of the Spanish language
 Instituto Cervantes, Cervantes Institute. A Spanish government agency, responsible for promoting the study and the teaching of the Spanish language and culture.
 FundéuRAE, Foundation of Emerging Spanish. A non-profit organization with collaboration of the RAE which mission is to clarify doubts and ambiguities of Spanish.

 Educational websites
 ProfeDeEle, Exercises targeted toward Spanish language teachers (ELE)
 AprenderEspanol, Spanish activities and material

 
Fusional languages
Languages of Argentina
Languages of Bolivia
Languages of Chile
Languages of Colombia
Languages of Costa Rica
Languages of Cuba
Languages of the Dominican Republic
Languages of Ecuador
Languages of El Salvador
Languages of Equatorial Guinea
Languages of Guatemala
Languages of Honduras
Languages of Mexico
Languages of Nicaragua
Languages of Panama
Languages of Paraguay
Languages of Peru
Languages of Puerto Rico
Languages of Spain
Languages of the United States
Languages of Uruguay
Languages of Venezuela
Lingua francas
Subject–verb–object languages